Renske Maria Leijten (born 17 March 1979) is a Dutch politician of the Socialist Party. She has been a member of the House of Representatives since 2006. She focuses on matters of public health, quality of life and sports. From 6 February 2014 until 29 May 2014 she was temporarily absent due to maternity leave, she was first replaced by Tjitske Siderius, and since 14 May 2014 by Henri Swinkels.

Since 2005 she has been a member of SP's party executive committee. From 2005 to 2007 she was also chairwoman of SP's youth organization ROOD.

Leijten studied Dutch language and literature at the University of Groningen. She was raised Roman Catholic but is now agnostic.

References 
  Parlement.com biography

External links 

  House of Representatives biography

1979 births
Living people
21st-century Dutch politicians
21st-century Dutch women politicians
Dutch anti-poverty advocates
Dutch agnostics
Dutch feminists
Former Roman Catholics
Members of the House of Representatives (Netherlands)
People from Leiden
Dutch socialist feminists
Socialist Party (Netherlands) politicians
University of Groningen alumni
20th-century Dutch women